Knockout Entertainment is singer Ray J's vanity label, founded in 2001. The label specializes in R&B, hip hop, and gospel. Originally released under Sanctuary Records, a press release in December 2007 announced a new partnership with E1 Records. Before this, he mentioned his label on his 2001 album This Ain't A Game.

The label's debut, Ray J's Raydiation album—released September 2005—included the top twenty hit "One Wish" and went on to sell 1 million copies worldwide. Other releases include Willie Norwood's gospel album titled I Believe, which was not released in conjunction with any other label, and was only available as a digital download or through CD Baby and top-twenty albums Ray J's All I Feel and sister Brandy's Human.

Roster

Artists

FiNaTTicZ
Ray J
 Yung Berg
Shorty Mack
Willie Norwood
TruthKO
Tasha Scott
Jason Miller

Discography

Albums

Future albums

Shorty Mack - Tha Purp Man (TBA)
Ray J - Raydiation 2 (TBA)

Singles
 From Raydiation (2005)

 From I Believe (2006)
 
 From All I Feel (2008)

 From Human (2008)

 From For the Love of Ray J (2009)

 From Sahyba (2012)

 From I Hit It First (2013)

References

American record labels
Record labels established in 2004
Companies based in Los Angeles